Dikin (also Romanized as Dīkīn and Dekīn) is a village in Moallem Kalayeh Rural District, Rudbar-e Alamut District, Qazvin County, Qazvin Province, Iran. At the 2006 census, its population was 334, in 111 families.

References 

Populated places in Qazvin County